Harry Monroe Caudill (May 3, 1922 – November 29, 1990) was an American author, historian, lawyer, legislator, and environmentalist from Letcher County, in the coalfields of southeastern Kentucky.

Biography
Caudill served in World War II as a private in the U.S. Army. After which, he was elected three times to the Kentucky State House of Representatives.  He taught in the History Department at the University of Kentucky from 1976 to 1984.

A common theme explored in many of Caudill's writings is the historic underdevelopment of the Appalachian region (particularly his own home area of southeastern Kentucky). In several of his books (most prominently Night Comes to the Cumberlands, 1962) and many of his published articles, he probes the historical poverty of the region, which he attributes in large part to the rapacious policies of the coal mining industries active in the region, as well as their backers: bankers of the northeastern United States.  He notes that such interests most often had their headquarters not in Appalachia but in the Northeast or Midwest, and thus failed to properly reinvest their sizable profits in the Appalachian region. Following publication of Night Comes to the Cumberlands, President John F. Kennedy appointed a commission to investigate conditions in the region and subsequently more than $15 billion in aid was invested in the region over twenty-five years.
 
In his later years he became an active opponent of the rapidly growing practice of strip mining as practiced by companies working in Appalachia, which he believed was causing irreparable harm to the land and its people.  He published articles in many magazines in addition to speaking out about the subject. Caudill pointed out that strip mining could be done responsibly as in England, Germany, and Czechoslovakia where topsoil, subsoil, and rocks are removed separately and placed back in layers in their original order.

Caudill became interested in the work of William Shockley, a scientist with controversial eugenicist stances at Stanford University in California. Caudill came to believe in Shockley's theory of "dysgenics," the argument that unintelligent people weaken the genes of a "race" over time. He felt that "genetic decline" in Eastern Kentucky contributed to issues of poverty. "The slobs continue to multiply," Caudill wrote in a 1975 letter to Time magazine. The editors of Time rejected Caudill's letter.

He also produced several volumes of folklore and oral history, which he collected himself from residents of the area centering on Letcher County and Harlan County, Kentucky.  One of those oral history interviews in 1941 of a man who would have been about 90 years old, was the basis for the 1995 movie, Pharaoh's Army, starring Chris Cooper, Patricia Clarkson, and Kris Kristofferson.

Caudill killed himself with a gunshot to the head in 1990, faced with an advancing case of Parkinson's disease.  He is buried in Battle Grove Cemetery, Cynthiana, Kentucky.

Legacy
The Harry M. Caudill Library located in Whitesburg, Kentucky, the main library of the Letcher County Public Library District, is named for Caudill.

Quote
"And we just can't afford to sit back and watch all that (land) be destroyed so a few people can get rich now. One of these days the dear old federal government is going to have to come in and spend billions of dollars just to repair the damage that's already been done. And guess who will have the machines and the workmen to do the job? The same coal operators who made the mess in the first place will be hired to fix it back, and the taxpayers will bear the cost."

Books by Harry M. Caudill
Night Comes to the Cumberlands: A Biography of a Depressed Area (1962; Boston: Little, Brown and Co., 1963).  .
My Land Is Dying (New York: E. P. Dutton, 1973).  .
The Watches of the Night (Boston: Little, Brown and Co., 1976).  .
A Darkness at Dawn: Appalachian Kentucky and the Future (Lexington: The University Press of Kentucky, 1976).  .
Dark Hills to Westward: The Saga of Jenny Wiley (1969; Ashland, KY: Jesse Stuart Foundation, 1994).  .
The Senator from Slaughter County (1973; Ashland, KY: Jesse Stuart Foundation, 1997).  .
The Mountain, the Miner, and the Lord and Other Tales from a Country Law Office (Lexington: The University Press of Kentucky, 1980).
Slender is the Thread: Tales from a Country Law Office (Lexington: The University Press of Kentucky, 1987).
Appalachian Wilderness: The Great Smoky Mountains (Epilogue written by Caudill; co-authored by Eliot Porter and Edward Abbey) (New York: Dutton, 1970)  .
Theirs Be the Power: The Moguls of Kentucky (Campaign, IL:University of Illinois Press, 1983)

References

Further reading

External links
The Harry Caudill Award for Journalism
Harry M. Caudill Library site
Guide to the Anne and Harry M. Caudill Collection, 1854-1996 at the University of Kentucky.

1922 births
1990 suicides
Appalachian writers
Appalachian studies
Kentucky lawyers
Writers from Kentucky
Democratic Party members of the Kentucky House of Representatives
People from Whitesburg, Kentucky
University of Kentucky faculty
American politicians who committed suicide
Suicides by firearm in Kentucky
Military personnel from Kentucky
United States Army personnel of World War II
American environmentalists
Oral historians
20th-century American historians
20th-century American male writers
20th-century American lawyers
20th-century American politicians
United States Army soldiers
American male non-fiction writers